A traction power station is a power station that produces only traction current, that is, electric current used for railways, trams, trolleybuses or other conveyances.  Pure traction power stations are rare and there are many more power stations that generate current for other purposes, such as standard three-phase alternating current (AC), in addition to traction current.

Examples

Australia
 Former Newport A Power Station, operated by the Victorian Railways in Melbourne.

Germany
 Muldenstein Bahnkraftwerk Muldenstein (German), in the former East Germany
 Nuclear power station Neckarwestheim Nuclear Power Plant (GKN Block 1) The only nuclear power station that produces traction current directly with the world's largest generator for single phase AC.
 Walchensee Hydroelectric Power Station, Bavaria.
 Pump storage power station Langenprozelten.
 Großkraftwerk Power Station in Mannheim.

Norway
 Hakavik Power Station
 Kjofossen Power Station

United Kingdom
 Former Lots Road Power Station in Chelsea, London.  Provided power to London Underground from 1905 to 2002.

United States
 Conowingo Dam, and Holtwood Dam on the Susquehanna River provide 25 Hz traction power for the Northeast Corridor in the United States

See also
Railway electrification system
Traction substation
Traction power network

References

Power station technology
Electric rail transport
Traction power networks